Kiriakoffalia lemairei is a moth of the family Erebidae. It was described by Hervé de Toulgoët in 1976. It is found in Cameroon, the Democratic Republic of the Congo and Gabon.

Subspecies
Kiriakoffalia lemairei lemairei (Cameroon)
Kiriakoffalia lemairei paleacea (Toulgoët, 1978) (Cameroon, the Democratic Republic of the Congo, Gabon)

References

 

Spilosomina
Moths described in 1976